Véronyque Tremblay (born January 27, 1974) is a Canadian journalist and politician. She represented the electoral district of Chauveau as a member of the Quebec Liberal Party.

Born in Saint-Ambroise, Quebec, Tremblay was a television and radio journalist for TQS, TVA, Le Canal Nouvelles and CJMF-FM, prior to becoming a politician.

Electoral record

References

Quebec Liberal Party MNAs
1974 births
Living people
Women MNAs in Quebec
People from Saguenay–Lac-Saint-Jean
Politicians from Quebec City
Canadian television news anchors
Canadian radio journalists
Canadian women television journalists
21st-century Canadian politicians
21st-century Canadian women politicians
Members of the Executive Council of Quebec
Women government ministers of Canada
Canadian women radio journalists